The Hogem Ranges are a group of mountain ranges in the northwest part of the Omineca Country of the North-Central Interior of British Columbia, Canada, located between Takla Lake (W) and the Omineca River (E) and from the Nation Lakes (SE) to the Sustut River (NW).  The ranges have a collective area of 8868 km2 and is a subgrouping of the Omineca Mountains which in turn form part of the Interior Mountains.

Rivers of the Hogem Ranges include the Sustut River and Mosque River.

Sub-ranges
Axelgold Range
Cariboo Heart Range
Connelly Range
Mitchell Range
Sikanni Range
Sitlika Range
Vital Range

References

Hogem Ranges in the Canadian Mountain Encyclopedia

Omineca Mountains
Omineca Country